Llandough may refer to the following places in the Vale of Glamorgan, Wales:

 Llandough, Llanfair, near Cowbridge
 Llandough, Penarth, near Cardiff
 Llandow, near Wick